St. Matthew Island is an uninhabited, remote island in the Bering Sea in Alaska,  west-northwest of Nunivak Island. The entire island's natural scenery and wildlife is protected as it is part of the Bering Sea unit of the Alaska Maritime National Wildlife Refuge.

Its most southerly point is Cape Upright which features cliff faces which exceed .

There is a small island off its northwestern point called Hall Island.

The United States Coast Guard maintained a staffed LORAN station on the island during the 1940s.

Geology and climate
The geological formation recorded on St. Matthew Island consists of calc-alkaline volcanic rocks of Late Cretaceous and earliest tertiary age with Pergelic Cryaquolls and Pergelic Cryoborolls soil types.

Human habitation
The first recorded attempt at settlement occurred in 1809, when a Russian group led by Demid Ilyich Kulikalov, under the guise of the Russian-American Company, established an experimental outpost.

A 2013 sailing expedition to the island showed that, in spite of the lack of human habitation, extensive areas of beach were heavily contaminated with plastic marine debris, particularly from the fishing industry.

Mammals
Presently, Arctic foxes and insular voles are the only mammals resident on the island, though polar bears occasionally visit via pack ice. Notably, St. Matthew Island represents the southern limit of the range of polar bears in the Bering Sea.

In 1944, 29 reindeer were introduced to the island by the United States Coast Guard to provide an emergency food source.  The Coast Guard abandoned the island a few years later, leaving the reindeer. Subsequently, the reindeer population rose to about 6,000 by 1963 and then died off in the next two years to 42 animals. A scientific study attributed the population crash to the limited food supply in interaction with climatic factors (the winter of 1963–64 was exceptionally severe in the region).  By the 1980s, the reindeer population had completely died out. Environmentalists see this as an issue of overpopulation. For example, ecologist Garrett Hardin cited the "natural experiment" of St. Matthew Island of the reindeer population explosion and collapse as a paradigmatic example of the consequences of overpopulation in his essay An Ecolate View of the Human Predicament.

Fish
There are two major lakes on the island, North Lake and Big Lake. The lakes contain a greater number of fish species (at least 5) than other nearby islands.

Lichen
Lichen studies were conducted on the island in the 1990s to prepare a list of lichens with their habitat, composition and distribution pattern. These studies were considered important for characterizing the eating habits of caribou and air quality. The vegetation of the islands has been classified as wet, moist and alpine tundra, based on landforms and drainage patterns. The plant communities were attributed to five categories. In the area of rock rubble fields and high ridges the vegetation was mainly crustacean lichens. Among the 148 lichen species of the islands, 125 showed the Arctic–alpine geographic distribution, 74 boreal, 18 were coastal, 9 amphi-Berengian and 41 widespread, with many species falling into more than one category. The lichen diversity was characterized by wide-ranging Arctic–alpine and boreal species; it was evaluated as luxuriant that was linked to reindeer species disappearing from the area.

Further reading
The Island That Humans Can't Conquer via Hakai Magazine

References

St. Matthew Island: Block 1045, Census Tract 1, Bethel Census Area, Alaska United States Census Bureau

Islands of Bethel Census Area, Alaska
Islands of the Bering Sea
Uninhabited islands of Alaska
Alaska Maritime National Wildlife Refuge
Protected areas of Bethel Census Area, Alaska
Islands of Unorganized Borough, Alaska